The Colonne Orchestra is a French symphony orchestra, founded in 1873 by the violinist and conductor Édouard Colonne.

History
While leader of the Opéra de Paris orchestra, Édouard Colonne was engaged by the publisher Georges Hartmann to lead a series of popular concerts which he founded under the title of ‘Concert National’ in March 1873. While at first a great success, the financial burden forced Hartmann to withdraw from the enterprise.

However, Colonne then decided to form his own orchestra, ‘l’Association artistique des Concerts Colonne’ based at the Théâtre du Châtelet in November 1873. The Concerts Colonne placed particular emphasis on contemporary music of the time (Saint-Saëns, Massenet, Charpentier, Fauré, d'Indy, Debussy, Ravel, Widor, Enescu, Dukas and Chabrier). Alongside these were programmed Wagner and Richard Strauss, and Colonne revived the music of Hector Berlioz such as La Damnation de Faust, which was performed 172 times up to the First World War.

Gustav Mahler, Peter Tchaikovsky, Claude Debussy, Edvard Grieg, Richard Strauss, Maurice Ravel, Gabriel Pierne, and Prokofiev conducted their music with the orchestra over the years.

Even after the departure of its founder the orchestra championed new music, with 22 premieres in the 1923–24 season.

A recent musical director, Laurent Petitgirard, had his contract renewed until 2014.

From 2016 the orchestra used the 1865 Salle Wagram, then equipped for 800 spectators, for its orchestral concerts.

Musical directors
 Édouard Colonne (1873–1910)
 Gabriel Pierné (1910–1932)
 Paul Paray (1932–1956)
 Charles Münch (1956–1958)
 Pierre Dervaux (1958–1992)
 Antonello Allemandi (1992–1997)
 Laurent Petitgirard (from 2004)

References

External links
 Association artistique des Concerts Colonne

French orchestras
Musical groups established in 1873
1873 establishments in France
Musical groups from Paris